The International Convention Center of the City of Madrid was a skyscraper project in Madrid, Spain.

It was designed to be 119 meters tall and was scheduled to be opened in 2014.

Architects:
Emilio Tuñón Álvarez (Mansilla+Tuñón)
Luis Moreno Mansilla (Mansilla+Tuñón)
Matilde Peralta del Amo.

External links

Official website

Buildings and structures in Fuencarral-El Pardo District, Madrid